Ahmed Nabeel Ahmed Ali Naser Ghailan (born on 25 August 1995), is a Bahraini professional footballer who plays as a defender for the Bahraini national team.

International career
Nabeel debuted internationally on 4 August 2019 at the WAFF Championship in Iraq in a match against Jordan in a 1–0 victory.

He appeared at the 2022 FIFA World Cup qualifying match against Iran in a 3–0 defeat on 7 June 2021.

On 21 November 2021, Nabeel was included final-23 squad for the 2021 FIFA Arab Cup.

References

1995 births
Living people
Bahraini footballers
Association football defenders
Bahrain international footballers